Stejaru is a commune in Teleorman County, Muntenia, Romania. It is composed of four villages: Bratcovu, Gresia, Socetu and Stejaru.

References

Communes in Teleorman County
Localities in Muntenia